Taieri Mouth is a small fishing village at the mouth of the Taieri River, New Zealand. Taieri Island (Moturata) lies in the ocean several hundred metres off the river's mouth.

It has a white sand beach for swimming and several picnic areas. Moturata is a distinctive landmark which can be walked to at low-tide. Caution is advised as the tides can change quickly. Another feature is the millennium walking track that follows the Taieri River from the mouth through the lower gorge to Henley.

The village is located 40 km southwest of central Dunedin on the Southern Scenic Route. It is located in the Clutha District on the boundary of Dunedin City and 10 km east of Lake Waihola. Immediately to its south is the smaller settlement of Taieri Beach, and the two are often considered parts of the same settlement.

It gained a little notoriety or sadness in the 1990s as the place where the father of murder suspect David Bain worked.

History

There was a Māori occupation site at Taieri Mouth, with moa bones, indicating it was from the Moa Hunter (early) period of Māori culture.

According to oral tradition in the early 18th century Tuwiriroa moved from Tititea on the Kawarau River near modern Queenstown and built a pa, Motupara, near Taieri Mouth. A rival, Tukiauau, had already built a pa, Whakaraupuka, inland on the Taieri Plain by Lake Waihola. Tuwiriroa had a daughter Haki Te Kura, famous for swimming across Lake Wakatipu. Tukiauau had a handsome son Korokiwhiti. The daughter and son now fell in love but the woman's father, the chief of the Taieri Mouth pa, disapproved. The young man's father was a hunted man. Hearing his enemies had discovered his whereabouts he decided to abandon the upriver settlement and move his people further south. As they came down the river in their canoes the distraught young woman attempted to jump from a rock into her lover's craft but struck the prow and was killed. Adding insult to injury her head was severed and held up angrily to her people on the shore as the flotilla passed by to the sea. There were repercussions and Tukiauau and his son were pursued and eventually killed.

Maori occupation continued and Edward Shortland recorded a small settlement on the site in 1843 and Maori were still living here in 1850. An early European settler was a former whaler, 'The Hermit of Taieri Mouth' (also known as John Bull) whose real name was John Edward O'Neil. He is remembered for his boisterous ways and prodigious strength.

Demographics
Taieri Mouth is described by Statistics New Zealand as a rural settlement.

Taieri Mouth had a population of 252 at the 2018 New Zealand census, an increase of 57 people (29.2%) since the 2013 census, and an increase of 63 people (33.3%) since the 2006 census. There were 108 households. There were 132 males and 123 females, giving a sex ratio of 1.07 males per female. The median age was 52.8 years (compared with 37.4 years nationally), with 39 people (15.5%) aged under 15 years, 18 (7.1%) aged 15 to 29, 123 (48.8%) aged 30 to 64, and 72 (28.6%) aged 65 or older.

Ethnicities were 95.2% European/Pākehā, 10.7% Māori, 1.2% Pacific peoples, and 3.6% other ethnicities (totals add to more than 100% since people could identify with multiple ethnicities).

Although some people objected to giving their religion, 54.8% had no religion, 29.8% were Christian and 2.4% had other religions.

Of those at least 15 years old, 36 (16.9%) people had a bachelor or higher degree, and 57 (26.8%) people had no formal qualifications. The median income was $28,000, compared with $31,800 nationally. The employment status of those at least 15 was that 81 (38.0%) people were employed full-time, 45 (21.1%) were part-time, and 3 (1.4%) were unemployed.

Education

The school opened in 1862.

References

Parkes, W., and Hislop, K. (1980) Taieri Mouth and its surrounding districts. Dunedin: Otago Heritage Books. 

Populated places in Otago
Southern Scenic Route
Taieri River